Shane Christopher Cadogan (born June 1, 2001 in Kingstown) is a Vincentian swimmer. He specializes in the 50-metres freestyle and is competing at the 2020 Summer Olympics in Tokyo. He finished 49th in the 50 metre freestyle heats, and did not advance to the semifinals.

Personal Bests 

 50-metre freestyle (25m pool) - 23.74s 
 50-metre freestyle (50m pool) - 24.71s
 50-metre butterfly (50m pool) - 26.16 NR 

NR = national record

References

External links

2001 births
Living people
Saint Vincent and the Grenadines male swimmers
Olympic swimmers of Saint Vincent and the Grenadines
Swimmers at the 2020 Summer Olympics
Competitors at the 2018 Central American and Caribbean Games
Commonwealth Games competitors for Saint Vincent and the Grenadines
Swimmers at the 2014 Commonwealth Games
Swimmers at the 2022 Commonwealth Games